The Window of the World is a theme park located in Changsha, Hunan, China. It has about 50 reproductions of some of the most famous tourist attractions in the world squeezed into 40 hectares.

History
The Window of the World was founded in 1997 by Hunan Dianguang Media co., LTD, Overseas Chinese Town Limited and China Travel Service (Hong Kong). As at 30 June 2016 Overseas Chinese Town Limited owned 25% stake.

List of major attractions in the Window of the World

Entertainment facilities  
 Roller coaster
 Bungee jump
 Ferris wheel
 Fairground ride apparatus 
 bumper boat
 The peacock garden
 The cinema
 Acrobatic performance
 Western theatre
 Western-style buildings
 Water entertainment facilities

See also
List of amusement parks in Asia

References

External links

Tourist attractions in Changsha
Buildings and structures in Changsha
Replica constructions in China